Dil Ne Jise Apna Kahaa is a 2004 Indian Hindi-language film starring Salman Khan, Preity Zinta, Bhumika Chawla, Delnaaz Paul, Riya Sen and Helen. It is a remake of the American film Return to Me (2000).

Plot 
Dil Ne Jise Apna Kahaa begins with Rishabh (Salman Khan) and Pari (Preity Zinta) who are deeply in love. He is a wealthy young man, working in an advertising agency and she is a hardworking, dedicated doctor. They marry and soon Pari is pregnant. Pari has a dream to create a hospital for children. Tragically, she is involved in an accident and dies in hospital. Pari's last wish was to donate her heart to her patient Dhani (Bhumika Chawla). Rishabh is devastated and opposes the plan to donate the heart; he goes ahead with Pari's last request: the creation of a children's hospital.

Dhani is cured, much to the joy of her family and her grandmother (Helen). Rishabh has gone into depression but soon comes across Pari's project to build a hospital for children named Fairyland. He begins to develop the project for the Fairyland Hospital. He is aided by his brother in law and his peers. Soon enough Rishabh and Dhani come across each other now that she works in his agency, and she feels an instant attraction to him. Rishabh ignores her advances as he is still very much in love with Pari. By the time the early concepts for the Fairyland hospital come in, Rishabh snaps at Dhani after she disapproves of the designs of the hospital. Rishabh does not know that Pari's heart was given to Dhani but soon he realizes that. Rishabh feels that he’s always responsible for someone’s death. Pari’s especially. His sister tells him that god must have given him the chance to love Pari again through Dhani. She gives him two choices: either to accept Dhani through Pari’s heart, or let her die. Rishabh agrees to accept this fate. While she is in the hospital, with doctors struggling to restart her broken heart, he falls in love with her. He tells her that he loves her, and if she loves him, she will pull through. She does, and the two get together.

Cast 
Salman Khan as Rishabh Mathur
Preity Zinta as Dr. Parineeta Mathur (Pari)
Bhumika Chawla as Dhanisha Chakraborty (Dhani)
Rati Agnihotri as Dr. Shashi Rawat Cardiologist
Helen as Dhani's grandmother
Renuka Shahane as Rishabh's Sister
Aasif Sheikh as R. Tripathi
Riya Sen as Kamini
Delnaaz Paul as Dhillo
Tarun Mehta as  
Pappu Polyester
Bobby Darling
Gulshan Devaiah as DJ in song
Vidyut Jammwal as Background dancer in the song “Go Balle Balle” (uncredited)

Production 
Aishwarya Rai as well as Amrita Rao were considered for the lead role in this debut directorial of Atul Agnihotri.

Box office 
The film had a poor opening at the box office and in the end only grossed ₹7 crore.

Soundtrack 
A. R. Rahman was signed as the music composer. He had composed three tracks and an instrumental, and left the project as he got busy with the stage adaptation of The Lord of the Rings. Meanwhile Himesh Reshammiya was signed to quickly compose the rest of the tracks.

References

External links 
 
Bollywood Hungama review

2000s Hindi-language films
2004 films
Films scored by A. R. Rahman
Films scored by Himesh Reshammiya
Indian remakes of American films
Indian pregnancy films